John Parkin may refer to:

John B. Parkin (1911–1975), Canadian architect and partner of John C. Parkin (no relation)
John C. Parkin (1922–1988), Canadian architect and partner of John B. Parkin (no relation)
John Parkin (infomercial presenter), British presenter of US infomercials
John Parkin (Wisconsin politician) (1918–2003), American businessman and politician
John Parkin (cricketer) (born 1944), English cricketer

See also
Jon Parkin (born 1981), English footballer
Jonty Parkin (1894–1972), English rugby league player